The following is a list of the 464 communes of the Puy-de-Dôme department of France.

Intercommunalities 
The communes cooperate in the following intercommunalities (as of 2020):
Clermont Auvergne Métropole
CA Agglo Pays d'Issoire
Communauté d'agglomération Riom Limagne et Volcans
Communauté de communes Ambert Livradois Forez
CC Billom Communauté
Communauté de communes Chavanon Combrailles et Volcans
Communauté de communes Combrailles Sioule et Morge
Communauté de communes Dômes Sancy Artense
Communauté de communes Entre Dore et Allier
Communauté de communes du Massif du Sancy (partly)
CC Mond'Arverne Communauté
Communauté de communes du Pays de Saint-Éloy
Communauté de communes Plaine Limagne
Communauté de communes Thiers Dore et Montagne

Communes 
List of the 464 communes:

Former communes 
Some communes merged into communes nouvelles in Puy-de-Dôme:
 Aulhat-Saint-Privat and Flat merged into Aulhat-Flat on 1 January 2016;
 Cellule and La Moutade merged into Chambaron-sur-Morge on 1 January 2016;
 Nonette and Orsonnette merged into Nonette-Orsonnette on 1 January 2016;
 Dallet and Mezel merged into Mur-sur-Allier on 1 January 2019;
 Creste and Saint-Diéry merged into Saint-Diéry on 1 January 2019;
 Vernet-la-Varenne and Chaméane merged into Le Vernet-Chaméane on 1 January 2019.

References

 
Puy-de-Dome